"Solanum lanuginosum" is a flowering plant species in the nightshade family (Solanaceae). It probably belongs to those species formerly in Solanum but nowadays placed in Lycianthes, though its exact identity and name remain undetermined.

It is endemic to Ecuador, but may be almost extinct due to habitat loss.

Footnotes

References
  [2008]: "Solanum lanuginosum". Retrieved 2008-SEP-29.

Lycianthes
Flora of Ecuador
Critically endangered plants
Taxonomy articles created by Polbot